Oscar Pettiford Sextet is an album by bassist/cellist and composer Oscar Pettiford which was recorded in 1954 and first issued on the French Vogue label as a 10-inch LP. The material on the original album was rereleased on Prestige in 1963 with additional recordings as The Oscar Pettiford Memorial Album.

Reception

The AllMusic review by Scott Yanow calls it an "excellent session which features Pettiford on occasional bass solos and (on "Rhumblues") overdubbed on cello... easily recommended to bop collectors".

Track listing 
All compositions by Henri Renaud except where noted.
 "Burt's Pad" - 9:45	
 "Marcel the Furrier" - 5:59	
 "Stardust" (Hoagy Carmichael, Mitchell Parish) - 5:08	
 "E-Lag" (Gerry Mulligan) - 2:33	
 "Rhumblues" (Jane Feather) - 4:27	
 "Ondine" (Leonard Feather) - 3:08	
 "Burt's Pad" [alternate take] - 6:26 Bonus track on CD reissue	
 "E-Lag" (Mulligan) [alternate take] - 2:38 Bonus track on CD reissue

Personnel 
Oscar Pettiford - cello, bass
Kai Winding - trombone
Al Cohn - tenor saxophone
Henri Renaud - piano
Tal Farlow - guitar
Max Roach - drums

References 

Oscar Pettiford albums
1954 albums
Disques Vogue albums